Givira cornelia is a moth in the family Cossidae. It is found in North America, where it has been recorded from Utah, Arizona, California and Nevada.

Adults have been recorded on wing in March, May and from July to August.

References

Natural History Museum Lepidoptera generic names catalog

Givira
Moths described in 1893